The Irish League in season 1901–02 comprised 8 teams, and Linfield won the championship.

League standings

Results

References
Northern Ireland - List of final tables (RSSSF)

1901-02
Ireland
Irish